Claude-François de Payan (4 May 1766, Saint-Paul-Trois-Châteaux - 28 July 1794, Paris) was a political figure of the French Revolution.

He was guillotined 28 July 1794 with 21 others during the Thermidorian Reaction, including Saint-Just and Robespierre.

Life

Early career
Payan was from a noble family in the Dauphiné, descended from the count palatines, which had held important army and magistrate posts. His father was the squire François de Payan and so Claude-François naturally joined an artillery regiment before the Revolution. On the Revolution he was highly enthused by the new ideas and fully subscribed to them. His elder brother Joseph-François de Payan was also a revolutionary.

Departmental roles

Actions in Paris

National agent in Paris

A rigorous policy

Thermidor

Sources 
 
  Albert Soboul, Dictionnaire historique de la Révolution française, Paris, PUF, 2005
  Notes et archives 1789–1794

References 

French people executed by guillotine during the French Revolution
1766 births
1794 deaths
People from Drôme